Rosanna Gabaldón is an American politician serving as a member of the Arizona Senate from the 21st district. She previously served as a member of the Arizona House of Representatives from January 14, 2013, to January 11, 2021, and as a member of the Arizona Senate from the 2nd district from January 11, 2021, to January 9, 2023.

Education 
Gabaldón attended Central High School.

Elections
 Gabaldόn ran and was successful in a contested primary election in August 2016, she and Daniel Hernández Jr. went on to win the general election.
 In 2014 Gabaldόn won reelection over Republican John Ackerley. Rosanna came in first ahead of Ackerley and Democratic Demion Clinco in the general election with 21,200 votes.
 Gabaldόn ran in an uncontested election in the August 26, 2014 Democratic primary, with 9,922 votes,
 Gabaldόn ran and was successful in a contested general election and won one of two seats in the November 6, 2012 with 27,081 votes, above Republican nominee John Ackerly.
 Gabaldόn ran in an uncontested primary election in the August 28, 2012 Democratic primary, with 9,158 votes,
 Gabaldόn ran and was successful in a contested race for in May 2009, for Sahuarita Town Council.

References

External links

 Profile at the Arizona Senate
 Campaign site
 

Place of birth missing (living people)
Year of birth missing (living people)
Hispanic and Latino American state legislators in Arizona
Hispanic and Latino American women in politics
Living people
Democratic Party members of the Arizona House of Representatives
People from Sahuarita, Arizona
Women state legislators in Arizona
21st-century American politicians
21st-century American women politicians